Walter Karl Johann Roepke (18 September 1882, Hohensalza – 7 February 1961, Wageningen) was a German entomologist who specialised in Lepidoptera and Coleoptera.

Roepke was educated in the University of Berlin and the University of Zürich where he took his PhD degree in 1907. From 1908−1911 he was on the staff of the Experiment Station at Salatiga, in Java becoming acting director in 1911−12 and director from 1912−18. From 1918−19 he was entomologist at the Institute for Plant Diseases, Buitenzorg and from 1919 he was professor at the Agricultural College, Wageningen. He retired in 1953.

Roepke was the author of entomological papers on the butterflies of Java and Indomalaya; he described many new taxa.

His collection of Hesperiidae from Indomalaya is in the Rijksmuseum van Natuurlijke Historie in Leiden.

References
Howard, L. O. (1930). History of Applied Entomology (Somewhat Anecdotal). Smiths. Miscell. Coll. 84 X+1-564.

1882 births
1961 deaths
German entomologists
People from the Province of Posen
Humboldt University of Berlin alumni
University of Zurich alumni
Academic staff of Wageningen University and Research
20th-century German zoologists